Grandma Brown's Baked Beans, also known as simply Grandma Brown Beans, is a brand name of canned baked beans that was founded by late Grandma Lulu Brown in 1937.

History 
In 1937, Grandma Lulu Brown made large pots of baked beans during the Great Depression to be sold at local grocery stores. However, these beans were so popular that Lulu and Earl Brown, her husband, decided to expand to Oswego, New York.

Over the years, the company was then known as Brown Whitney Brown (BWB), when Earl Brown died, and Richard Whitney joined the company, and soon after, a plant was established in Mexico, New York to process the large quantities of the beans.

References

Canned food
Baked beans